Hers may refer to:

 The possessive pronoun version of she
 Two rivers in southern France:
 Hers-Vif (also: Grand Hers or Hers)
 Hers-Mort
 The Georgian name for the indigenous people of Hereti, more commonly called Èrs
 Her's, a former English rock band from Liverpool
 Hims & Hers Health, a telemedicine company

People with the surname:
 François Hers (born 1943), Belgian photographer and artist
 Henri G. Hers (1923–2008), Belgian scientist

HERS may refer to:
 Epithelial root sheath or Hertwig’s epithelial root sheath
 Various energy rating systems:
 Home Energy Rating system in the United States
 House Energy Rating scheme in Australia

See also
 Her (disambiguation)